The Last Kilometer (original title: L'Ultimo Chilometro) is a 2012 Italian documentary film directed by Paolo Casalis.

Summary
The film is portrait of road cycling made through 4 characters: Ignazio Moser and his father Francesco Moser, Davide Rebellin, Gianni Mura, Didi Senft.

References

2012 films
Italian documentary films
2010s Italian-language films
Documentary films about cycling